Baneuil is a commune in the Dordogne department in southwestern France.

Population

See also
Communes of the Dordogne department
Château de Baneuil

References

Communes of Dordogne